Launched by Gramophone magazine in late 2011, the Gramophone Hall of Fame is an annual listing of the men and women (artists, producers, engineers, A&R directors and label founders) who have contributed to the classical record industry. Fifty individuals and ensembles entered the Hall of Fame in its first year. A special edition of the magazine (May 2012 issue)  celebrates this new initiative, and the list was first published online on 6 April 2012.

Voting

Entrants were chosen by a public vote on Gramophone's website, with voters able to choose from a shortlist of over 200 industry figures and musicians chosen by the magazine's editors. The list is intended to be updated on a yearly basis, again, by public vote.

2012 entrants

Conductors 
Claudio Abbado 
John Barbirolli
Daniel Barenboim
Thomas Beecham
Leonard Bernstein
Pierre Boulez
Wilhelm Furtwängler
John Eliot Gardiner
Nikolaus Harnoncourt
Herbert von Karajan
Carlos Kleiber
Otto Klemperer
Simon Rattle
Georg Solti
Arturo Toscanini

Singers 
Angela Gheorghiu
Janet Baker
Cecilia Bartoli
Jussi Björling
Maria Callas
Enrico Caruso
Joyce DiDonato
Plácido Domingo
Dietrich Fischer-Dieskau
Birgit Nilsson
Luciano Pavarotti
Elisabeth Schwarzkopf
Joan Sutherland

Keyboard players 
Martha Argerich
Claudio Arrau
Daniel Barenboim
Alfred Brendel
Glenn Gould
Vladimir Horowitz
Murray Perahia
Maurizio Pollini
Sviatoslav Richter
Arthur Rubinstein
Lang Lang

String/brass players 

Pablo Casals
Jacqueline du Pré
Jascha Heifetz
Yehudi Menuhin
David Oistrakh
Itzhak Perlman
Mstislav Rostropovich

Ensembles
Beaux Arts Trio
Takács Quartet

Producers/record label executives
John Culshaw
Walter Legge
Ted Perry

2013 entrants

Conductors 
Karl Böhm 
Adrian Boult 
Sergiu Celibidache 
Colin Davis 
Gustavo Dudamel 
Carlo Maria Giulini 
Bernard Haitink 
Mariss Jansons 
Rafael Kubelík
James Levine 
Charles Mackerras 
Zubin Mehta 
George Szell 
Bruno Walter

Singers 
Montserrat Caballé 
Renée Fleming
Thomas Hampson 
Anna Netrebko 
Leontyne Price 
Bryn Terfel 
Fritz Wunderlich

Pianists
Leif Ove Andsnes 
Vladimir Ashkenazy 
Emil Gilels 
Wilhelm Kempff 
Arturo Benedetti Michelangeli 
Sergei Rachmaninoff
Grigory Sokolov

String/brass/woodwind players
Maurice André 
Julian Bream 
James Galway
Heinz Holliger 
Steven Isserlis
Yo-Yo Ma 
Wynton Marsalis 
Albrecht Mayer 
Anne-Sophie Mutter 
Emmanuel Pahud 
Jean-Pierre Rampal 
Jordi Savall 
Andrés Segovia 
John Williams

Vocal and instrumental ensembles
Alban Berg Quartet 
Amadeus Quartet 
The King's Singers 
Tallis Scholars

Producers/engineers/record label executives
Bernard Coutaz 
Fred Gaisberg 
Klaus Heymann 
Goddard Lieberson 
Kenneth Wilkinson

References

Classical music awards
British music awards
Awards established in 2011
2011 establishments in the United Kingdom
Halls of fame in the United Kingdom
Music halls of fame